Shodhganga: a reservoir of Indian theses (Sanskrit: , ; Ganga, the river) is a digital repository of theses and dissertations submitted to universities in India.

About 
It is maintained by INFLIBNET Centre which is an autonomous Inter-University Centre of the University Grants Commission (UGC) of India. It was initially located in the campus of Gujarat University, Ahmedabad. As of January 2013, INFLIBNET Centre has moved to its new institutional building at infocity, Gandhinagar, capital of Gujarat.

By 2022, as many as 544 universities in India have signed MoUs with the INFLIBNET Centre to participate in the Shodhganga project. The full text of all the documents submitted to Shodhganga are available to read and to download in open access to the academic community worldwide. The repository has a collection of over 300,000 theses and 8000 synopses. The Shodhganga repository was created consequent on the University Grants Commission making it mandatory through regulations issued in June 2009 for all universities to submit soft copies of PhD theses and MPhil dissertations to the UGC for hosting in the INFLIBNET.

Those universities that have signed MoUs with INFLIBNET Centre are required to identify a senior academic to serve as a university coordinator to liaise with the university and the centre. Responsibilities of the coordinator include timely submission of soft copies of PhD theses submitted to the university to Shodhganga and to verify the correctness and completeness of these soft copies.

It has been observed that "online availability of electronic theses through centrally maintained digital repositories will not only ensure easy access and archiving of these but will also help in raising the quality and standard of research."

The INFLIBNET Centre is also maintaining another repository known by the name Shodhgangotri which is a repository of the synopses and research proposals of the PhD programmes in Indian universities. It has been described as a repository of the details of Indian Research in Progress.

License 
The submissions made to Shodhganga are made available under Creative Commons License Attribution-NonCommercial-ShareAlike 4.0 International (CC BY-NC-SA 4.0).

References

Further reading

Shodhganga

 
 

Shodhgangotri

External links 
 Home page of Shodhganga
 Home page of ShodhGangotri

Indian digital libraries
Higher education in India